Roman Micał (13 January 1939 – 25 March 2021) was a Polish field hockey player. He competed in the men's tournament at the 1960 Summer Olympics.

References

External links
 

1939 births
2021 deaths
Polish male field hockey players
Olympic field hockey players of Poland
Field hockey players at the 1960 Summer Olympics
People from Rzeszów